Summers is an unincorporated community and census-designated place (CDP) in far western Washington County, Arkansas, United States. It was first listed as a CDP in the 2020 census with a population of 166.

The community has a postal designation (ZIP code 72769). It is part of the Northwest Arkansas region.

Geography
Summers is in the Ozarks on the southern edge of the Springfield Plateau near the Boston Mountains. It is just east of Ballard Creek.

History 
The community name comes from John T. Summers, one of the original postmasters for the community. The community was earlier named Coon Creek.

Education
The community is served by the Lincoln Consolidated School District. Lincoln High School is its sole high school.

Demographics

2020 census

Note: the US Census treats Hispanic/Latino as an ethnic category. This table excludes Latinos from the racial categories and assigns them to a separate category. Hispanics/Latinos can be of any race.

Notable person

George W. Bond was an educator, born in Summers in 1891. He was president of Louisiana Tech University from 1928 to 1936.

References

Unincorporated communities in Washington County, Arkansas
Northwest Arkansas
Unincorporated communities in Arkansas
Census-designated places in Washington County, Arkansas
Census-designated places in Arkansas